Uruguay Gustavo Graffigna Banhoffer, also known as Uri Banhoffer or Yuri Banhoffer (14 January 1948 – 12 March 2021) was a Uruguayan footballer who played for clubs in Uruguay, Chile, the Netherlands and the United States. He died from COVID-19 during the COVID-19 pandemic in Chile and Alzheimer's disease.

Career
Born in Montevideo, Uruguay, Graffigna moved to Chile in 1968 after playing for Defensor Sporting in his homeland. He helped Unión San Felipe win the 1971 Primera División title and after a spell with Antofagasta, he moved to Mexico to play for C.F. Pachuca.

Graffigna played two seasons in the NASL for the Los Angeles Aztecs and won the championship in 1974. He next moved to the Netherlands where he joined Eerste Divisie club PEC Zwolle. Graffigna spent three seasons with PEC, and had a goal disallowed as the club lost the 1976–77 KNVB Cup final to FC Twente. In 1978 he clinched promotion to Holland's top level after winning the Eerste Divisie league title. He left for Chile in 1979 after his father died there and to be close to his mother.

Personal life
He naturalized Chilean in 2015, keeping the Uruguayan nationality.

In 1968 he came to Chile to join Unión La Calera where his older brother, Pedro Graffigna, played since 1966.

He lived in Quillota, Chile.

References

External links
 Uri Banhoffer at North American Soccer League Players
 Uri Banhoffer at North American Soccer League

1948 births
2021 deaths
Footballers from Montevideo
Association football forwards
Uruguayan footballers
El Tanque Sisley players
San Luis de Quillota footballers
Unión San Felipe footballers
Unión Española footballers
C.F. Pachuca players
Atlético Español footballers
C.D. Aviación footballers
Los Angeles Aztecs players
PEC Zwolle players
Santiago Morning footballers
Deportes Iberia footballers
Uruguayan Segunda División players
Chilean Primera División players
Primera B de Chile players
Liga MX players
Eerste Divisie players
North American Soccer League (1968–1984) players
Uruguayan expatriate footballers
Expatriate footballers in Chile
Uruguayan expatriate sportspeople in Chile
Expatriate footballers in Mexico
Uruguayan expatriate sportspeople in Mexico
Expatriate footballers in the Netherlands
Uruguayan expatriate sportspeople in the Netherlands
Expatriate soccer players in the United States
Uruguayan expatriate sportspeople in the United States
Uruguayan emigrants to Chile
Naturalized citizens of Chile
Deaths from the COVID-19 pandemic in Chile